16-O-Methylcafestol, a derivative of cafestol, is an isolate of green coffee beans. 

This derivative only occurs in the robusta variant of coffee (as opposed to the more expensive arabica, where only cafestol is present). Thus 16-O-Methylcafestol is used as an analytical marker for determining the robusta content of coffee blends.

References

Furans